In the Dark or in the dark may refer to:

Albums 
 In the Dark (Toots & the Maytals album) (1973)
 In the Dark (Grateful Dead album) (1987)
 In the Dark (The Whigs album) (2010)
 In the Dark – Live at Vicar Street, an album by Josh Ritter (2006)
 In the Dark, an album by Dutch indie band Face Tomorrow (2008)

Songs 
 "In the Dark" (Bix Beiderbecke song), (1931)
 "In the Dark" (Billy Squier song) from Don't Say No (1981)
 "In the Dark" (Bring Me the Horizon song), from Amo (2019)
 "In the Dark" (Camila Cabello song), (2018)
 "In the Dark" (Dev song),  from The Night The Sun Came Up (2011)
 "In the Dark" (Purple Disco Machine and Sophie and the Giants song), (2022)
 "In the Dark" (Tiësto song), from Elements of Life (2007)
 "In the Dark", a song by 3 Doors Down from Us and the Night (2016)
 "In the Dark", a song by The Birthday Massacre from Pins and Needles (2010)
 "In the Dark", the working title of "You're the One" by Charli XCX (2012)
 "In the Dark", a song by Corinne Bailey Rae from The Heart Speaks in Whispers (2016)
 "In the Dark", a song by Flyleaf from Memento Mori (2009)
 "In the Dark", a song by In Flames from Foregone (2023)
 "In the Dark", a song by JoJo from Can't Take That Away from Me (2010)
 "In the Dark", a song by Kate Miller-Heidke from Nightflight (2012)
 "In the Dark," a song from "Nina Simone Sings the Blues," 1967, RCA (1967), an adaptation of "Two Cigarettes in the Dark," et al.
 "In the Dark", a song by Swae Lee from Shang-Chi and the Legend of the Ten Rings: The Album (2021)

Television 
 In the Dark (British TV series), a 2017 BBC crime drama miniseries, based on a novel by Mark Billingham
 In the Dark (American TV series), a 2019 drama series on The CW
 "In the Dark" (Angel), a 1999 episode of the television program Angel
 "In the Dark" (Law & Order: Criminal Intent), a 2004 episode of the television program Law & Order: Criminal Intent
 "In the Dark" (NCIS), a 2007 episode of the television program NCIS
 "In the Dark" (Tru Calling), a 2005 episode of the television program Tru Calling
 In the Dark, a 2013 TV movie directed by Richard Gabai and starring Elisabeth Röhm

Other
 In the Dark (podcast), a true crime and investigative journalism podcast produced by American Public Media
 In the Dark (Kuprin novel), a novel by Alexander Kuprin
 In the Dark, a novel by Mark Billingham
 In the Dark, a novel by Mai Jia
 In the Dark, a horror novel by Richard Laymon
 "in the dark", a poker term — see Glossary of poker terms
 In the Dark, a 2012 horror film starring Shannon Elizabeth